Late Settings is a 1985 collection of poetry by James Merrill (1926–1995).  

His first book since The Changing Light at Sandover in 1982, Late Settings marked a return to the style, subject matter, and form that had characterized Merrill's poetry from 1951 to 1976.

External links

Poetry by James Merrill
1985 poetry books
American poetry collections